Spanish verbs are a complex area of Spanish grammar, with many combinations of tenses, aspects and moods (up to fifty conjugated forms per verb). Although conjugation rules are relatively straightforward, a large number of verbs are irregular. Among these, some fall into more-or-less defined deviant patterns, whereas others are uniquely irregular. This article summarizes the common irregular patterns.

As in all Romance languages, many irregularities in Spanish verbs can be retraced to Latin grammar.

Orthographic changes
Due to the rules of Spanish orthography, some predictable changes are needed to keep the same consonant sound before a or o and e or i, but these are not usually considered irregularities. The following examples use the first person plural of the present subjunctive:
 : c—qu:  >  (-car),  >  (-quir).
 : z—c:  >  (-zar),  >  (-cer).
 : g—j:  > . But in verbs ending in -jar, the j is kept before e:  >  (not ).
 : g—gu:  >  (-gar),  >  (-guir).
 : gu—gü:  >  (-guar).
Other predictable changes involve stress marks, i—y alternations and i-dropping, some of which are sometimes considered as irregularities. The examples are several forms of otherwise regular preterites:
 Stress mark not used in monosyllabic forms:  >  ,  ;  > , .
 Unstressed i is written y between non-silent vowels:  > ,  (-aer, -caer);  > ,  (-uir).  This does not apply to verbs ending in -quir (for example,  >).
 Unstressed i is dropped between ll or ñ and a vowel:  >  (not *bullió) (-llir/-ñir),  >  (-ñer).

Stem-vowel changes
There are two kinds of changes that can affect stem vowels of some Spanish verbs:  diphthongization and vowel raising. Both changes affect -e- or -o- in the last (or only) syllable of a verb stem. Diphthongization changes -e- to -ie-, and -o- to -ue-. Vowel raising changes the mid vowels -e- and -o- to the corresponding high vowels:  -i- and -u- respectively. Some verbs, in their various forms, can exhibit both kinds of changes (e.g.

Diphthongization
Some verbs with -e- or -o- in their stem are inherently diphthongizing, whereas others are not: their identities must be learned individually.  
In a diphthongizing verb, the change turns -e- into -ie- and -o- into -ue- when the syllable in question is stressed, which in effect happens only in the singular persons and third-person plural of the present indicative and present subjunctive, and in the imperative (all other tenses and forms are stressed on their endings, not their stems). The dictionary form always has the vowel, not the diphthong, because, in the infinitive form, the stress is on the ending, not the stem.

In word-initial position, *ie- is written ye- ( > ) (e-ie > ye) and *ue- is written hue- ( > ) (o-ue > hue, oler). Also, the -ue- diphthong is written -üe- after g, with the diaeresis to indicate that the letter is not silent ( > ) (reflexive, go-güe -zar).

The following examples show that all three conjugations (-ar, -er, and -ir verbs) include some diphthongizing verbs (only some tenses and persons are shown, for contrasting purposes):

Present indicative

Present subjunctive

(*) In Central America pensés, contés, etc. are used, but Spanish Royal Academy prescribes pienses, cuentes, etc., according to Rioplatense Spanish.

Imperative

(*) Only used in Spain. Formal conjugations of the plural imperative end in -d, but in colloquial use the most common conjugation ends in -r instead: pensar, contar, etc.

The verbs  and  also undergo vowel raising.

Many verbs with -e- or -o- in the root do not alternate.

Less frequent verbs of this kind are often a source of mistakes for children learning to speak, and also for some adults:

Vowel raising

Affected forms
The forms that exhibit the change can be described negatively as those in which the stem vowel is not diphthongized and the ending does not contain stressed i or the -ir- sequence. In other words, vowel raising affects the forms whose endings do not contain an i which is not part of a diphthong, taking into account that diphthongizing overrides vowel raising.

In effect, for diphthongizing verbs (e.g.), the vowel-raising forms are: 
 the first-person and second-person plural of the present subjunctive (sintamos, sintáis, durmamos, durmáis);
 the gerund (sintiendo, durmiendo);
 the third-person singular and plural of the preterite (sintió, sintieron, durmió, durmieron);
 all forms of the imperfect subjunctive (sintiera/sintiese..., durmiera/durmiese...) and of the future subjunctive (sintiere..., durmiere...).

For non-diphthongizing verbs (e.g. ) it affects these same forms (pidamos, pidáis, pidiendo, pidió, pidieron, pidiera...), plus: 
 in the present indicative, all singular forms and the third-person plural (pido, pides, pide, piden);
 the remaining forms of the present subjunctive (pida, pidas, pidan);
 the tú form of the imperative (pide).

The forms which do not undergo either diphthongizing or vowel raising are:
 the first-person and second-person plural of the present indicative (sentimos, sentís), because these forms have stressed /í/ in their endings.
 the infinitive (sentir), past participle (sentido), imperfect indicative (sentía...) and the vos and vosotros/as forms of the imperative (sentí, sentid), for the same reason.
 the future (sentiré...) and conditional (sentiría...), whose endings contain the -ir- sequence.

Affected verbs
Verbs which are diphthongizing and vowel-raising include:
  and derived verbs (...) in the gerund (...), as the rest of forms undergo other overriding irregularities.

The diphthongizing -er verb  exceptionally undergoes vowel rising in the gerund, but the first- and second-person plural of the present subjunctive are regular (podamos, podáis).

Non-diphthongizing vowel-rising verbs include:
 those ending in -edir (...), -etir and -egir (...; note forms with j before a/o such as corrijo, corrija).
 those ending in -eír. Double i that would result is simplified (not  or ). The stressed i in contact with a/e/o must take an acute accent (río, ríe, ría) but monosyllabic forms of the preterite do not have it (rio, riais, but rió and riáis also valid if pronounced in two syllables).
 those ending in -eñir (...). The unstressed i between ñ and a vowel is dropped (tiñendo, tiñó, tiñeron, tiñera...).
  and derived verbs (...), in the forms that do not undergo other overriding irregularities.
  and derived verbs
 .
 . The affected forms are equal to those derived from the more usual infinitive , which is regular except in the past participle .

The vowel-raising verb  is usually diphthongizing (with ye- forms as yergo...), not-diphthongizing forms are however valid but rare (irgo...) (e-ie > ye-i -guir, -erguir).

Diphthongs and hiatus

Cambio vs. envío
Diphthongs in the infinitive may be preserved throughout the conjugation or broken in the forms which are stressed on the stem, depending on whether the i or u in contact with a/e/o take the stress or not. The stressed vowel is marked bold in the examples:  > cambio, but  > envío (requiring an acute accent to indicate the resulting hiatus). Remember that the presence of a silent h does not break a diphthong, so a written accent is needed anyway in rehúso.

Two diphthongs are kept in  > desahucio (again the -h- makes no difference), which thus follows both the anunciar and causar models.

In spite of that, the regular accentuation rules can also be used if they are pronounced as bisyllabic: crié, guiáis....

For the verbs  and  both options are valid: adecuo or adecúo.

Verbs ending in -uir and -oír
All verbs ending in -uir (e.g. ,) add a medial -y- before all endings not starting with i: construyo, construyes, construya... Taking into account that these verbs also undergo the change of unstressed intervocalic i to y (see orthographic changes above), they have many forms containing y.

Logically,  loses the diaeresis before y: arguyo, arguyó (gü-gu, -güir)...

Other common irregular patterns

Endings starting with o/a in er/ir verbs
In er and ir verbs, the first person singular of the present indicative and the whole present subjunctive are the only forms whose endings start with o/a instead of e/i. These two different phonetic environments made Latin forms evolve differently in many verbs, leading to irregularities.
 Whenever the first person singular of the present indicative has an irregularity other than diphthongizing, but still ends in -o, the whole present subjunctive shares the same irregularity:
 > hago, haga... (-hacer, G-Verb)
 > luzco, luzca... (c-zc, -cir)
 > quepo, quepa... (-caber)
 > veo, vea...;  > preveo, prevea... (-ver)
 When the first person singular of the present indicative does not end in -o, the present subjunctive is also irregular, but in a different way:
 > soy, sea... (-ser, Oy-Verb)
 > voy, vaya... (-ir, Oy-Verb)
 > he, haya (-haber)
 > sé, sepa... (-saber)

G-verbs
Before o (in the first person singular of the indicative present tense) and a (that is, in all persons of the present subjunctive), the so-called G-verbs (sometimes "Go-Yo verbs" or "Yo-Go" verbs or "Go" verbs) add a medial -g- after l and n (also after s in asir), add -ig- when the root ends in a vowel, or substitute -g- for -c-. This change overrides diphthongization (tener, venir) but combines with vowel-raising (decir). Many of these verbs are also irregular in other ways. For example:

: yo salgo, tú sales... Stem: sal- (-salir)
: yo valgo, tú vales... Stem: val- (-valer)
: yo pongo, tú pones... Stem: pon- (-poner)
: yo tengo, tú tienes... Stem: ten- tien- (e-ie) (-tener)
: yo vengo, tú vienes... Stem: ven- vien- (e-ie)
: yo caigo, tú caes... Stem: ca-
: yo traigo, tú traes... Stem: tra-
: yo oigo, tú oyes... Stem: o-, oy- (-ír)
: yo hago, tú haces... Stem: hac- haz- (-cer verb)
: yo digo, tú dices... Stem: dec-, dic- (e-i) (-cir)
: yo asgo, tú ases... Stem: as-

ZC-verbs
This group of verbs—which originated in the Latin inchoative verbs but now includes other verbs as well—substitute -zc- for stem-final -c- before o and a. The group includes nearly all verbs ending in -acer (except  and derived verbs), -ecer (except  and ), -ocer (except  and derived verbs), and -ucir. For example:

: yo nazco, tú naces...
: yo crezco, tú creces...
: yo conozco, tú conoces...
: yo produzco, tú produces... (-ducir)
: yo yazco/yago/yazgo, tú yaces... (-yacer)
 may alternatively be conjugated with -zc-, -g- (G-Verb) or a compromise -zg-.

Irregular forms in the future, conditional and imperative
This involves syncope:
 Just dropping the infinitive e:  → habré...,  → sabré...,  → podré...,  → ...
 Dropping the infinitive e/i and padding the resulting *-lr-/*-nr- with an epenthetic -d-:  → tendré...,  → ...,  → ...,  → ...,  → ...
 Dropping the infinitive -ce- or -ec-:  → haré...,  → desharé...,  → diré...
 ,  and  may share this irregularity (prediré...) or, more commonly, use the regular forms (predeciré). For  and  only the regular forms are used (bendeciré...).
Many of these verbs also have shortened tú imperative forms (apocope): tener → , contener → , poner → , disponer → , venir → , salir → , hacer → , decir → . However, all verbs derived from decir are regular in this form: bendice, maldice, desdícete, predice, contradice.

Anomalous stems in the preterite and derived tenses
Some verbs (including most G-verbs and most verbs ending in ) have a somewhat different stem in the preterite. These stems are very old and often are found in Latin as well. The same irregular stem is also found in the imperfect subjunctive (both in -ra and -se forms) and the future subjunctive. These stems are anomalous also because: 
 they are stressed in the first and third persons singular, ending in unstressed -e and -o respectively (while in all other cases the preterite is stressed on the suffix).
 in the verbs with -je preterite (and most verbs ending in ) unstressed i is dropped between the j and a vowel: , ... This does not happen with regular or vowel-raising -ger/-jer/-gir/-jir verbs ( > ,  > ,  > ,  > ).

Examples:

: yo estuve, tú/vos estuviste(s), él estuvo..., ellos estuvieron; yo estuviera...
: yo anduve, tú/vos anduviste(s), él anduvo..., ellos anduvieron; yo anduviera...
: yo tuve, tú/vos tuviste(s), él tuvo..., ellos tuvieron; yo tuviera...
: yo hube, tú/vos hubiste(s), él hubo..., ellos hubieron; yo hubiera...
: yo cupe, tú/vos cupiste(s), él cupo..., ellos cupieron; yo cupiera...
: yo supe, tú/vos supiste(s), él supo..., ellos supieron; yo supiera...
: yo vine, tú/vos viniste(s), él vino..., ellos vinieron; yo viniera...
: yo pude, tú/vos pudiste(s), él pudo..., ellos pudieron; yo pudiera...
: yo puse, tú/vos pusiste(s), él puso..., ellos pusieron; yo pusiera...
: yo hice, tú/vos hiciste(s), él hizo..., ellos hicieron; yo hiciera...
: yo reduje, tu/vos redujiste(s), él redujo..., ellos redujeron; yo condujera...
: yo dije, tú/vos dijiste(s), él dijo..., ellos dijeron; yo dijera...

The verb  in modern Spanish has a regular -er verb preterite (yo vi, tú viste, él vio – note the lack of written accent on monosyllables), but in archaic texts the irregular preterite forms yo vide, él vido are sometimes seen.

Irregular past participles

A number of verbs have irregular past participles, sometimes called "strong" because the change is in the root, rather than an ending. Examples:
  → ,  → 
  → ,  → ,  → 
  → ,  → 
  → ,  → 
  → ,  → ,  → 

Most of these verbs have derivatives with the same irregularity. For example, alongside volver → vuelto and poner → puesto, there are  →  and  → ; alongside   →  there is  →  (but note  → ,  →  are regular, though they also have the adjectival forms  and ).

There are three verbs that have both a regular and an irregular past participle.

Others

Their tú imperative forms are sé, ve (for both ir and ver, although  is more common than ver in commands) and prevé. Their vos imperative forms are sé, andá (the verb  replaces ir), ve and prevé.

Remember that whenever the preterite is irregular, the imperfect subjunctive (-ra and -se forms) and the dated future subjunctive (-re) share the same irregularity; indeed, these tenses may always be correctly formed by substituting the appropriate endings for the -ron ending of the third person plural preterite: fueron > fuera/fuese...; fuere....

The form dé is so written to distinguish it from the preposition . Both verbs are also irregular in the preterite and derived tenses: dar follows the pattern of regular -er/-ir verbs, while estar has an anomalous preterite stem and follows the corresponding common pattern:

References

External links

 Dictionary of the Royal Spanish Academy. It features a Conjugar button in each verb entry.
 Onoma Spanish conjugator. It provides information about the irregularities and conjugates invented verbs.
Common irregular Spanish verbs and audio examples
Spanish verb conjugator don Quijote Spanish School
Online Spanish verb conjugation Free online Spanish verb conjugation
Spanish conjugation Spanish conjugator. 12,000 verbs conjugated.
 Diccionario panhispánico de dudas. Apéndice 1: Modelos de conjugación verbal.
decimos.net A Spanish verb conjugator, partly based on this Wikipedia article, that explains each conjugated form step by step.
List of all Spanish irregular verbs Complete list of over 270 Spanish irregular verbs.

Irregular verbs
Indo-European verbs